Persatuan Sepakbola Indonesia Bantaeng (simply known as Persiban Bantaeng) is an Indonesian football club based in Bantaeng Regency, South Sulawesi. They currently compete in the Liga 3.

References

Sport in South Sulawesi
Football clubs in Indonesia
Football clubs in South Sulawesi
Association football clubs established in 1967
1967 establishments in Indonesia